Boris Ilyich Seidenberg (21 May 1929, Odessa, Soviet Union - 20 October 2000, Odessa, Ukraine) was a Soviet actor and a Meritorious Artist of the Russian Socialist Federal Soviet Republic.

Biography
Seidenberg was interested in acting from an early age. Despite his family's objections, he went to study at the Aleksander Ostrovsky Theater and Art Academy in Tashkent. Though located in the remote Uzbek SSR, the academy's staff consisted of some of the Soviet Union's best dramatists, who moved in there from Moscow and Leningrad after being blacklisted as rootless cosmopolitans during Andrei Zhdanov's artistic purges.

After graduating at 1950, Seidenberg joined the cast of the Alexander Pushkin Dramatical Theater in Magnitogorsk. After three years there, he began acting in the Bryansk Regional Theater. His work on the stage earned him the title Meritorious Artist of the Russian SFSR on 1961. Seidenberg moved to the Odessa Russian Theater at 1962, where he  performed a wide range of characters; his appearances as Mercutio in Romeo and Juliet were especially praised by critics. He also depicted Cyrano de Bergerac, King Lear, Hamlet and many other Shakespearean protagonists.

He later directed more than thirty stage productions, mainly in the Russian Theater but also in the Vasilko Musical-Dramatical Theater in Odessa. He also held the tenure of an associate professor in the municipal Antonina Nezhdanova Conservatory's opera department. Seidenberg continued directing and producing plays until his death.

He made his debut on screen as cavalryman Emelyanov in the 1965 film Viper, based on the 1928 eponymous novel by Aleksey Nikolayevich Tolstoy. The film was received positively and viewed by 34 million people, making it the seventh highest-grossing Soviet film of the year. Seidenberg appeared in more than forty films altogether.

Partial filmography

1965: Viper
1967: The Search
1967: Wedding bells
1967: Silent Odessa
1969: I'm His Betrothed
1970: Liberation
1971: Insolence
1971: Criminal Inspector
1972: The Washington Correspondent
1974: Revenge
1975: Black Caravan
1975: What's Wrong With You?
1978: The Fortress
1981: The Adventures of Tom Sawyer and Huckleberry Finn
1983: Through the Gobi Desert and Xing'an
1985: The Temptation of Don Giovanni
1985: Train Off Schedule
1986: Opponents
1994: A Train to Brooklyn

References

External links

1929 births
2000 deaths
Actors from Odesa
Soviet male stage actors
Soviet male film actors
Soviet theatre directors
Ukrainian theatre directors
Honored Artists of the RSFSR
Theatre people from Odesa